The 2018 Malaysia Super League, known as 2018 unifi Malaysia Super League for sponsorship reasons, was the 15th season of the Malaysia Super League, the top-tier professional football league in Malaysia.

Johor Darul Ta'zim were the defending champions.

Club licensing regulations

Starting this season, every team in the Liga Super Malaysia must have a FAM Club Licence to play in the league, or else they are relegated. To obtain a FAM Club Licence, teams must be financially healthy and meet certain standards of conduct as organisations. As part of privation effort for the league, all clubs compete in Liga Super Malaysia and Liga Premier Malaysia will be required to obtained FAM Club Licence.

As in other national leagues, there are significant benefits to being in the top division:
A greater share of television broadcast licence revenues goes to Liga Super Malaysia sides.
Greater exposure through television and higher attendance levels helps Liga Super Malaysia teams attract the most lucrative sponsorships.
Liga Super Malaysia teams develop substantial financial muscle through the combination of television and gate revenues, sponsorships and marketing of their team brands. This allows them to attract and retain skilled players from domestic and international sources and to construct first-class stadium facilities.
Despite several reminders from FAM from the beginning of 2015, however there are few teams failed to get the approval for both AFC and FAM club licenses from First Instance Body (FIB) .

*Updated: 6 December 2017

Teams

Sarawak and Penang were relegated to 2018 Malaysia Premier League after finished 11th and bottom place of last season league. Kuala Lumpur and Terengganu promoted to 2018 Malaysia Super League after securing place as champions and runners-up in 2017 Malaysia Premier League.

On 21 November 2017, it was announced that T-Team who finished ninth in the Super League last year, will play in the 2018 Malaysia Premier League pending approval from Football Malaysia LLP (FMLLP). The suggestion then were approved on 4 December 2017, followed by an announcement stating that Felda United, who finished third last season are ineligible to compete in this year top-tier competition. They were replaced by Negeri Sembilan and PKNP.

Venues

1:  Perak plays at Lumut due to the upgrading of their own stadium at Perak Stadium

2:  PKNP plays at Batu Kawan due to the upgrading of Perak Stadium

3:  Kelantan plays their home games at their opponents stadium during Ramadan, due to ban of Sultan Muhammad IV Stadium usage by state government during Ramadan

Personnel, kit and sponsoring

Notes;
Shahrel Fikri was the official captain of PKNP, before he was loaned to Nakhon Ratchasima, Hafiz Ramdan filled in as captain for PKNP.

Coaching changes

Foreign players
Southeast Asia (SEA) players need to have acquired at least 30 international caps for their senior national team with no period restriction on when caps are earned and those who has less than 30 international caps will be subjected to FMLLP approval.

Players name in bold indicates the player is registered during the mid-season transfer window.

Naturalisation players

Notes:
  Carrying Malaysian heritage.
  Participated in the Malaysia national team squad.

Results

League table

Result table

Positions by round

Season statistics

Top scorers

Players sorted first by goals, then by last name.

Top assists
Players sorted first by assists, then by last name.

Hat-tricks

Notes:
(H) – Home ; (A) – Away

Own goals
As of 28 July 2018

Clean sheets

See also
 2018 Malaysia Premier League
 2018 Malaysia FAM Cup
 2018 Malaysia FA Cup
 2018 Malaysia Cup
 2018 Malaysia Challenge Cup
 2018 Piala Presiden
 2018 Piala Belia
 List of Malaysian football transfers 2018

References

External links
 Football Association of Malaysia website
 Football Malaysia LLP website

Malaysia Super League
Malaysia Super League seasons
1